Neurocognitive functions are cognitive functions closely linked to the function of particular areas, neural pathways, or cortical networks in the brain, ultimately served by the substrate of the brain's neurological matrix (i.e. at the cellular and molecular level). Therefore, their understanding is closely linked to the practice of neuropsychology and cognitive neuroscience, two disciplines that broadly seek to understand how the structure and function of the brain relate to cognition and behaviour.

A neurocognitive deficit is a reduction or impairment of cognitive function in one of these areas, but particularly when physical changes can be seen to have occurred in the brain, such as aging related physiological changes or after neurological illness, mental illness, drug use, or brain injury.

A clinical neuropsychologist may specialise in using neuropsychological tests to detect and understand such deficits, and may be involved in the rehabilitation of an affected person. The discipline that studies neurocognitive deficits to infer normal psychological function is called cognitive neuropsychology.

Etymology 
The term neurocognitive is a recent addition to the nosology of clinical Psychiatry and Psychology. It was used rarely before the publication of the DSM-5, which updated the psychiatric classification of disorders listed in the "Delirium, Dementia, and Amnestic and Other Cognitive Disorders" chapter of the DSM-IV. Following the 2013 publication of the DSM-5, use of the term "neurocognitive" increased steadily.

Adding the prefix "neuro-" to the word "cognitive" is an example of pleonasm because, analogous to expressions like "burning fire" and "black darkness," the prefix "neuro-" adds no further useful information to the term "cognitive". In the field of clinical neurology, clinicians continue using the simpler term "cognitive", due to the absence of evidence for human cognitive processes that do not involve the nervous system.

See also

 Cognition
 Cognitive neuropsychology
 Cognitive neuroscience
 Cognitive rehabilitation therapy
 Neurology
 Neuropsychology
 Neuropsychological test
 Neurotoxic
 Brain fog
 Hallucinogen persisting perception disorder
 Depersonalization
 Dementia
 Mild cognitive impairment
 Attention deficit hyperactivity disorder
 Concussions in sport

References

Further reading
 Green, K. J. (1998). Schizophrenia from a Neurocognitive Perspective. Boston, Allyn and Bacon.

Cognition
Cognitive neuroscience
Neuropsychology